Kurixalus banaensis (Bana bubble-nest frog) is a species of frog in the family Rhacophoridae.
It is endemic to Vietnam. Its natural habitat is subtropical or tropical moist lowland forests.

References

Amphibians of Vietnam
Endemic fauna of Vietnam
banaensis
Taxonomy articles created by Polbot
Amphibians described in 1939
Taxa named by René Léon Bourret